Salvatore "Sam" Greco (born 3 May 1967) is an Australian retired full contact karateka, heavyweight K-1 kickboxer, mixed martial artist. He was the 1994 Karate World Cup champion and holds notable kickboxing victories over Branko Cikatic, Ernesto Hoost, Mike Bernardo, Stefan Leko, and Ray Sefo, as well as MMA victories over Heath Herring and Shungo Oyama.

Biography and career
Salvatore Greco was born on 3 May 1967, in Melbourne, Victoria, Australia and grew up in the suburb of Brunswick. In 2015, Greco stated that he considered the part of Brunswick that he grew up in was 'rough' at the time, and ultimately contributed to his fitness & mental development from a young age. His Italian-born father, Vittorio, encouraged him to get involved with soccer from an early age and joined the local Italian backed club, Juventus.

Soccer

Greco joined Juventus (later Brunswick United Juventus) at the age of six, playing as a junior for nine years where in 1983 he would win the club's best-and-fairest for their under-sixteen squad. Prior to the 1984 National Soccer League season, Greco signed a one-year semi-professional contract with the senior squad, who had just been promoted from the Victorian State Premier League to the former national league, making him the club's youngest player to sign for the senior squad.

Greco made his national debut in the fifth round of the season on 1 April 1984, two days before his seventeenth birthday. Greco started and played the whole home match against Footscray JUST at Gillon oval that finished in a 0–2 loss. At the conclusion of the season and after ten years playing for his local club, Greco decided to focus solely on karate and discontinued his soccer career at the age of seventeen.

Karate
Greco started training in Kyokushin karate at the age of 11 and commenced tournament fighting at the age of 18 establishing himself as one of Australia's best Kyokushin fighters in the late 1980s and early 1990s winning the heavyweight division of the Australian championships five times in 1988, 1989, 1990, 1991 and 1992. In 1988, he fought in the heavyweight division of the 1st Commonwealth Karate Championships held in Sydney placing 3rd with English champion Michael Thompson winning. In 1991, he competed in the 5th World Open Tournament in Japan losing to Michael Thompson in the first round on decision due to accidentally punching him in the face. In 1992, he competed in the heavyweight division of the Oyama Cup Singapore International Open in Singapore placing 3rd with Papua New Guinean Walter Schnaubelt winning.

After the Singapore tournament in October 1992, Sam left Kyokushin fighting as an amateur to join Seidokaikan karate to become a professional karate fighter. Fellow Kyokushin champion Andy Hug had recently joined Seidokaikan and won the 2nd Karate World Cup in October and then in 1993 Michael Thompson also joined Seidokaikan. In June 1993, Sam had his first karate fight at the K-1 Sanctuary III a kickboxing tournament promoted by Seidokaikan karate founder Kazuyoshi Ishii. Sam fought Keisuke Nakagawa who had placed 6th in the 2nd Karate World Cup. In October 1993, Sam competed in the 3rd Karate World Cup defeating Minoru Fujita to make the quarter finals to fight Toshiyuki Atokawa with the judges decision a draw after the first round, and again in the second round, with the fight awarded to Toshiyuki Atokawa on weight difference, who went on to place 3rd. In October 1994, Sam competed in the 4th Karate World Cup making the final after winning four fights. In the final he fought Michael Thompson winning in the first round with a left low kick followed by a straight right body shot to become the Karate World Cup Champion.

K-1
Sam had his K-1 debut in 1995 at K-1 Hercules. Following year he appeared in his first K-1 World Grand Prix tournament where he suffered his first loss in semifinals against Musashi.

After retiring in 2005 from professional competition, Sam Greco worked as trainer for other fighters, including Bob Sapp.

Professional wrestling
Greco was originally signed to professional wrestling company World Championship Wrestling, but never wrestled for them, as it folded before he could debut beyond a backstage vignette. He would not make his wrestling debut until November 2002, when he signed up by Wrestle-1, then a co-promotion between K-1 and All Japan Pro Wrestling. In the first Wrestle-1 event, Greco teamed up with masked lucha libre exponent Dos Caras Jr. against Kaz Hayashi and Taiyo Kea, all while wearing his own mask and playing a Dos Caras body double named "Sam Grecaras". They won, with Greco receiving good reviews in the process.

He wrestled again in December 2003, appearing in AJPW to team up with Keiji Mutoh and Abdullah the Butcher against Taka Michinoku, Jamal and D'lo Brown from the villainous faction RO&D. His third and last venture in professional wrestling would be two years later, as part of the briefly revived Wrestle-1 concept. This time he formed a team with fellow K-1 fighter Jan Nortje against Giant Bernard and The Predator, who defeated them when Bernard pinned Nortje.

Acting career
In 1995 Greco had a small part as an enforcer in the Richard Norton movie Under the Gun, also known as Iron Fist, which was filmed in Victoria. He played the stunt double for retired professional wrestler Stone Cold Steve Austin in the 2007 action thriller The Condemned and also had a small part in the 2008 Australian boxing drama film, Two Fists One Heart which was shot in Western Australia. He has also appeared occasionally in movies as a fight consultant and martial arts advisor.

He had a small part in the fourth episode of the Australian mini-series Underbelly, playing nightclub bouncer Bruno Bolotzi.  The episode was first broadcast in February 2008.

He had a small part in an episode of the Australian comedy Pizza, playing the Roman soldier Glutious Maximus. He made another appearance for Pizza this time in a two-part episode Holiday Pizza, playing Pauly's Italian cousin Luigi. The last appearance he made in Pizza was in the Cracker Pizza episode, playing Crackerus in the last season of the series. He also had a part in the Australian comedy Swift and Shift Couriers as Louie "Luigi" Marietti. Both Pizza and Swift and Shift Couriers were created by Greco's good friend Paul Fenech.

He played the Masked Wrestler Zarkos in Scooby-Doo. In the movie Zarkos appears as one of N'Goo Tuana's henchmen, but later he sneaks up on Daphne and captures her and steals the Daemon Ritus from her. Later in the movie he tries to sneak up on Daphne and capture her again but instead they end up fighting; near the end of the fight, he grabs Daphne and throws her onto his back and puts her in a hold but she escapes and defeats him.

Personal life
On 23 March 2018, Greco suffered a heart attack prior to and during his fighter Jimmy Crute competing in the Hex Fight Series and had triple bypass surgery.

Titles and accomplishments
 1999 K-1 World Grand Prix 3rd Place
 1999 W.A.K.O. Pro World Muay Thai Super Heavyweight Champion
 1995 The Best of the Best Tournament Champion
 1994 W.K.A. World Muay Thai Super Heavyweight Heavyweight Champion
 1994 Seidokaikan Karate World Cup Champion
 5 time Australian Kyokushin Karate Heavyweight Champion

Kickboxing record

|-  bgcolor=#FFBBBB
| 2003-10-11 || Loss ||align=left| Peter Graham || K-1 World Grand Prix 2003 Final Elimination || Osaka, Japan || TKO (Leg injury) || 2 || 0:30
|-
! style=background:white colspan=9 |
|-
|-  bgcolor=#FFBBBB
| 2000-04-23 || Loss ||align=left| Ernesto Hoost || K-1 The Millennium || Osaka, Japan || TKO (Corner Stoppage) || 3 || 3:00
|-  bgcolor=#FFBBBB
| 1999-12-05 || Loss ||align=left| Mirko Cro Cop || K-1 Grand Prix '99 Final Round Semi Finals || Tokyo, Japan || TKO (Left Low Kick/two knockdowns) || 2 || 2:50
|-  bgcolor=#CCFFCC
| 1999-12-05 || Win ||align=left| Ray Sefo || K-1 Grand Prix '99 Final Round Quarter Finals || Tokyo, Japan ||Decision (Unanimous) || 3 || 3:00
|-  bgcolor=#CCFFCC
| 1999-10-05 || Win ||align=left| Stefan Leko || K-1 World Grand Prix '99 Opening Round || Osaka, Japan || Decision (Majority) || 3 || 2:35
|-
! style=background:white colspan=9 |
|-
|-  bgcolor=#FFBBBB
| 1999-07-18 || Loss ||align=left| Peter Aerts || K-1 Dream '99 || Nagoya, Japan || KO (Right high kick) || 2 || 1:38
|-  bgcolor=#CCFFCC
| 1999-06-20 || Win ||align=left| Mike Bernardo || K-1 Braves '99 || Fukuoka, Japan || Decision (Unanimous) || 5 || 3:00
|-
! style=background:white colspan=9 |
|-
|-  bgcolor="#c5d2ea"
| 1999-03-22 || NC ||align=left| Samir Benazzouz || K-1 The Challenge '99 || Tokyo, Japan || No Contest (Greco right leg injury) || 2 || 3:00
|-  bgcolor=#FFBBBB
| 1998-12-13 || Loss ||align=left| Andy Hug || K-1 Grand Prix '98 Final Round Semi Finals || Tokyo, Japan || Decision (Majority) || 3 || 3:00
|-  bgcolor=#CCFFCC
| 1998-12-13 || Win ||align=left| Ernesto Hoost || K-1 Grand Prix '98 Final Round Quarter Finals || Tokyo, Japan || TKO (Corner stoppage/cut) || 2 || 3:00
|-  bgcolor=#CCFFCC
| 1998-09-27 || Win ||align=left| Matt Skelton || K-1 World Grand Prix '98 Opening Round || Osaka, Japan || Decision (Unanimous) || 5 || 3:00
|-
! style=background:white colspan=9 |
|-
|-  bgcolor=#CCFFCC
| 1998-05-24 || Win ||align=left| Carl Bernardo || Crash at the Crown || Melbourne, Australia || TKO || 5 || 
|-  bgcolor=#FFBBBB
| 1998-07-18 || Loss ||align=left| Jérôme Le Banner || K-1 Dream '98 || Nagoya, Japan || KO (Punch) || 2 || 2:07
|-  bgcolor=#FFBBBB
| 1997-11-09 || Loss ||align=left| Francisco Filho || K-1 Grand Prix '97 Final Quarter final || Tokyo, Japan || KO (Right hook) || 1 || 0:15
|-  bgcolor=#CCFFCC
| 1997-09-07 || Win ||align=left| Jean-Claude Leuyer || K-1 Grand Prix '97 1st Round || Osaka, Japan || KO (Right hook) || 2 || 1:55
|-
! style=background:white colspan=9 |
|-
|-  bgcolor=#CCFFCC
| 1997-07-20 || Win ||align=left| Branko Cikatić || K-1 Dream '97 || Nagoya, Japan || KO (Right hooks) || 1 || 2:58
|-  bgcolor=#c5d2ea
| 1997-04-29 || Draw ||align=left| Andy Hug || K-1 Braves '97 || Fukuoka, Japan || Decision draw || 5 || 3:00
|-  bgcolor=#c5d2ea
| 1996-12-08 || Draw ||align=left| Jérôme Le Banner || K-1 Hercules '96 || Nagoya, Japan || Decision draw || 5 || 3:00
|-  bgcolor=#CCFFCC
| 1996-10-18 || Win ||align=left| Gerry Harris || K-1 Star Wars '96 || Yokohama, Japan || TKO || 1 || 2:38
|-  bgcolor=#c5d2ea
| 1996-09-01 || NC ||align=left| Musashi || K-1 Revenge '96 || Osaka, Japan || No contest || 3 || 0:22
|-  bgcolor=#FFBBBB
| 1996-05-06 || Loss ||align=left| Musashi || K-1 Grand Prix '96 Quarter Finals || Yokohama, Japan || TKO (Doctor stoppage/broken toe) || 1 || 3:00
|-  bgcolor=#CCFFCC
| 1996-03-10 || Win ||align=left| Perry Telgt || K-1 Grand Prix '96 Opening Battle || Yokohama, Japan || Decision (Unanimous) || 5 || 3:00
|-
! style=background:white colspan=9 |
|-
|-  bgcolor=#CCFFCC
| 1995-12-09 || Win ||align=left| Duane Van Der Merwe || K-1 Hercules || Nagoya, Japan || KO (Kick) || 1 || 1:24
|-  bgcolor=#CCFFCC
| 1995-10-22 || Win ||align=left| Stan Longinidis || The Best of the Best Tournament, Final || Melbourne, Australia || Decision (Unanimous) || 3 || 3:00
|-
! style=background:white colspan=9 |
|-
|-  bgcolor=#CCFFCC
| 1995-10-22 || Win ||align=left| Ben Hamilton || The Best of the Best Tournament, Semi Finals || Melbourne, Australia || Decision (Unanimous) || 3 || 3:00
|-  bgcolor=#CCFFCC
| 1995-10-22 || Win ||align=left| Sam Sweet || The Best of the Best Tournament, Quarter Finals || Melbourne, Australia || KO  || 1 || 
|-  bgcolor=#FFBBBB
| 1995-09-03 || Loss ||align=left| Peter Aerts || K-1 Revenge II || Yokohama, Japan || Decision (Unanimous) || 5 || 3:00
|-  bgcolor=#CCFFCC
| 1995-03-03 || Win ||align=left| Vjatcheslav Soukhanov || K-1 Grand Prix '95 Opening Battle || Tokyo, Japan || KO (Punch) || 3 || 1:33
|-
! style=background:white colspan=9 |
|-
|-  bgcolor=#CCFFCC
| 1994-12-10 || Win ||align=left| Masaaki Satake || K-1 Legend || Nagoya, Japan || KO (Right punch) || 2 || 1:27
|-
! style=background:white colspan=9 |
|-
|-
| colspan=9 | Legend:

Mixed martial arts record 

|-
| Win 
|align=center| 3–1–1
|Shungo Oyama 
| KO (knees and punches) 
| Hero's 3 
| 
|align=center| 1 
|align=center| 2:37 
| Tokyo, Japan
|
|-
| Win 
|align=center| 2–1–1
|Heath Herring 
| TKO (knee injury) 
| Hero's 1 
| 
|align=center| 1 
|align=center| 2:41
| Saitama, Saitama, Japan
|
|-
| Loss 
|align=center| 1–1–1
|Lyoto Machida 
| Decision (split) 
| K-1 MMA ROMANEX 
| 
|align=center| 3 
|align=center| 5:00
| Saitama, Saitama, Japan
|
|-
| Win 
|align=center| 1–0–1
|Stefan Gamlin 
| Submission (rear-naked choke) 
| K-1 Beast 2004 in Niigata 
| 
|align=center| 1 
|align=center| 0:25
| Niigata Prefecture, Japan 
|
|-
| Draw
|align=center| 0–0–1
|Masaaki Satake 
| Draw 
| Inoki Bom-Ba-Ye 2001 
| 
|align=center| 3 
|align=center| 5:00
| Saitama, Saitama, Japan
|

See also
List of K-1 events
List of K-1 champions
List of male kickboxers

References

Further reading

External links

Profile at K-1

Living people
Sportspeople from Melbourne
Sportsmen from Victoria (Australia)
Australian male karateka
Australian male kickboxers
Heavyweight kickboxers
Australian male mixed martial artists
Heavyweight mixed martial artists
Male actors from Melbourne
Australian people of Italian descent
1967 births
Mixed martial artists utilizing Kyokushin kaikan
Mixed martial artists utilizing Seidokaikan
Mixed martial artists utilizing wrestling
Australian male professional wrestlers
Association football midfielders
Soccer players from Melbourne
Australian soccer players
National Soccer League (Australia) players
Brunswick Juventus players
People from Brunswick, Victoria